Cezary Kosiński (born 8 April 1973) is a Polish actor. He appeared in more than forty films since 1997.

Selected filmography

References

External links 

1973 births
Living people
Polish male film actors